Opening may refer to:

 Al-Fatiha, "The Opening", the first chapter of the Qur'an
 The Opening (album), live album by Mal Waldron
 Backgammon opening
 Chess opening
 A title sequence or opening credits
 , a term from contract bridge
 , a term from contract bridge
 Grand opening of a business or other institution
 Hole
 Inauguration
 Keynote
 Opening (morphology), a morphological filtering operation used in image processing
 Opening sentence
 Opening statement, a beginning statement in a court case
 Overture
 Salutation (greeting)
 Vernissage

See also